James Keane may refer to:

James Keane (actor) (born 1952), American film and television actor
James Keane (bishop) (1857–1929), U.S. Catholic prelate
James Keane (musician) (born 1948), Irish accordionist
Jim Keane (1924–2011), American football player
Jim Keane (politician) (born 1941/1942), Democratic Party member of the Montana Senate
James Keane (director) of Richard III (1912 film)
James F. Keane (1934–2020), American politician

See also
James Keene (disambiguation)